Mariela Andrea Serey Jiménez (born 22 December 1980) is a Chilean teacher who was member of the Chilean Constitutional Convention.

References

External links
 
 BCN Profile

Living people
1981 births
Chilean people of French descent
21st-century Chilean politicians
Members of the Chilean Constitutional Convention
21st-century Chilean women politicians